Dato' Ramli bin Dato' Mohd Nor (Jawi: رملي بن محمد نور; born 1 October 1958) is a Malaysian politician and former police officer who has served as the Deputy Speaker of the Dewan Rakyat I under Speaker Johari Abdul since December 2022 and the Member of Parliament (MP) for Cameron Highlands since January 2019 and Non-Executive Chairman of Amanah Raya Berhad (ARB) since May 2020. He is a member of United Malays National Organisation (UMNO), a component party of the ruling Barisan Nasional (BN) coalition.

Early life and education
Ramli was born at Batu 12 Orang Asli Settlement, Jalan Pahang, Gombak, Selangor in 1958. Ramli's father was a native of Peninsular Malaysia from the Semai tribe, Cameron Highland, Pahang. His mother is from the Temiar tribe from Gua Musang, Kelantan.

He received his Certificate in Criminal Justice Education from University of Virginia, Diploma in Public Administration from Universiti Teknologi MARA, Diploma in Police Science from Universiti Kebangsaan Malaysia, Bachelor of Arts in Business Studies (Hons) from University of East London, as well as Federal Bureau of Investigation (FBI) National Academy Graduate 244th Session, Quantico, Virginia US. He holds a master’s Degree in Public Administration with distinction from Open University Malaysia and is currently pursuing his doctorate (PhD) in Business from International University of Malaya-Wales.

Early career
Ramli's career in public service spanned 38 years beginning in 1980 when Ramli served as port traffic officer at Johor Port Authority.

He joined the police force in 1984 and served for 34 years before become a retired senior police officer in Royal Malaysia Police (RMP) with the rank of Assistant Commissioner of Police (ACP).

Political career
On 26 January 2019, Ramli firstly contested in Cameron Highlands by-election and he was picked as candidate given that he was the direct member of BN. He went on to win the by-election and became the new Cameron Highlands MP. The election was held after the Election Court on 30 November 2018 declared the victory of the incumbent MP of BN and the Malaysian Indian Congress (MIC), Sivarraajh Chandran for the seat in the election null and void because it was found that corrupt practices had been committed in the 2018 general election (GE14). 

He won the by-election after defeating M. Manogaran of Democratic Action Party (DAP) from Pakatan Harapan (PH) and two other independent candidates, Wong Seng Yee and Sallehudin Ab Talib, with a majority of 3,238 votes.

He is the first ever indigenous Orang Asli candidate to be elected into the Dewan Rakyat as an MP. Ramli later joined UMNO as its member. 

On 15 May 2020, he was appointed as Non-Executive Chairman of Amanah Raya Berhad (ARB).

On 1 March 2022, he was tasked to chair the Dewan Rakyat sitting as temporary Deputy Speaker of the Dewan Rakyat II replacing Azalina Othman Said and created history as the first ever Orang Asli deputy speaker although not being officially appointed to the position yet. He is however widely expected to be officially appointed in the next Dewan Rakyat meeting after multiple postponements of the appointment on 14 September 2021 for the first time, 25 October 2021 for the second time, 1 March 2022 for the third time, 18 July 2022 for the fourth timeand 3 October 2022 for the fifth timeas well as his expected win in the contest for the position between him and former deputy speaker Nga Kor Ming who is trying to make a comeback to the position.  However on 3 October 2022 when Minister in the Prime Minister's Department in charge of Parliament and Law Wan Junaidi unveiled the fifth postponement of the appointment of the deputy speaker position, he also revealed that the Pakatan Harapan (PH) opposition coalition did not nominate another candidate, in contrast with the previous news and hence the government was withdrawing its candidate. Although he was yet to be officially appointed as deputy speaker, the media has already referred him as the deputy speaker, suggesting falsely that he had been officially appointed to the position during the period of these multiple postponements.

Election results

Honours 
  :
  Member of the Order of the Defender of the Realm (AMN) (2007)
  Officer of the Order of the Defender of the Realm (KMN) (2016)
  Royal Malaysia Police :
 Warrior of the Most Gallant Police Order (PPP) (2005)
 Loyal Commander of the Most Gallant Police Order (PSPP) (2017)
 :
 Recipient of the Distinguished Service Medal (PPT) (2008)
 :
 Knight Companion of the Order of the Crown of Pahang (DIMP) – Dato' (2021)

References

External links
 

1958 births
Living people
People from Selangor
Orang Asli
Malaysian Muslims
Malaysian police officers
United Malays National Organisation politicians
Members of the Dewan Rakyat
21st-century Malaysian politicians
Officers of the Order of the Defender of the Realm
Members of the Order of the Defender of the Realm